Leffe is a town and comune near the Alps in Lombardy, Italy. The town is a center of textile industry.

History

Fossils have been founded during the 20th century in the lignite mines, now preserved at the Museums of Natural Science in Milan and Bergamo. It is mentioned for the first time in a document of 903 with the name of Leufo.

Main sights
 Palazzo Comunale. It has a portico and open gallery, together with an internal courtyard and well. 
 The Parish House. It has an open gallery and music room, frescoed by Evaristo Baschenis, a painter from Bergamo of the 17th century. 
 The Parish Church of San Michele (16th century), conserving a wooden sculptural group by Andrea Fantoni, dating from 1694, called la Madonnina.

References

External links
Official website